is an online free-to-play role-playing game created by Kadokawa, Deluxe Games, and Preapp Partners. It was released in Japan on October 17, 2019 for Android and iOS devices. An anime television series adaptation by C2C aired from April 5 to June 28, 2020. The game ended service on October 31, 2020.

Characters

The new president of Kibou Company and the main protagonist.

The secretary of Kibou Company and Minato's childhood friend.

A warrior who works for Kibou Company. She is Makoto's older sister.

A monk and botanist who works for Kibou Company. He is Akari's younger brother.

A longtime employee of Kibou Company who is in charge of deskwork. She has been with the company since it was founded 15 years ago by Minato's father.

President of the startup company Cyedge. While a skilled adventurer himself, his arrogance often gets him into trouble.

An employee of Cyedge.

A knight working for Imperial, one of the top companies in the world.

A self-proclaimed genius wizard who becomes a new employee of Kibou Company.

A maju that can speak human language and a new employee of Kibou Company. She was an outcast among her tribe and was recruited by Makoto to join.

Anime
An anime television series adaptation was announced on December 1, 2019. The series is animated by C2C and directed by Hiroki Ikeshita, with Kenta Ihara handling series composition, Keisuke Watanabe designing the characters, and Yukari Hashimoto composing the series' music. Azumi Waki performs the opening theme song "Hurry Love", while Kana Ichinose performs the ending theme song . It aired from April 5 to June 28, 2020. Episode 11 was set to originally air on June 14, 2020, but had been delayed a week later to June 21, 2020 due to production problems.

References

External links
 
 

2019 video games
2019 Japanese novels
Android (operating system) games
Anime television series based on video games
C2C (studio)
Free-to-play video games
Funimation
Gacha games
IOS games
Isekai anime and manga
Japan-exclusive video games
Japanese role-playing video games
Manga based on video games
Shōnen manga
Video games developed in Japan